Inmaculada Rodríguez-Piñero Fernández (born 7 January 1958, in Madrid) is a Spanish politician for the Spanish Socialist Workers' Party (PSOE). Married with two children, she earned a master's degree in economic theory from the University of Minnesota and served as economic and employment spokesperson for the PSOE.

Role in national politics
In 2008, Rodríguez-Piñero was selected as second placed candidate on the PSOE list for Valencia province and was consequently elected to the Spanish national parliament.

On 16 April 2009 Rodríguez-Piñero was named State Secretary for Infrastructure and Planning by the Minister of Public Works José Blanco López in the government of Prime Minister José Luis Rodríguez Zapatero. She subsequently resigned her parliamentary seat. In her capacity as State Secretary, she served as ex-officio member of the board of the Sociedad Estatal de Infraestructuras del Transporte Terrestre (SEIIT).

Member of the European Parliament, 2014–present
Rodríguez-Piñero has been a Member of the European Parliament since the 2014 European elections. She has since been serving on the Committee on International Trade. Since 2019, she has been part of the Democracy Support and Election Coordination Group (DEG), which oversees the Parliament's election observation missions.

In addition to her committee assignments, Rodríguez-Piñero is part of the parliament's delegation to the EU-Chile Joint Parliamentary Committee. She is also a member of the European Parliament Intergroup on Long-Term Investment and Reindustrialization, the European Parliament Intergroup on Disability and the Spinelli Group.

External links
Biography at Spanish Congress site

References

|-

|-

1958 births
Living people
Members of the 9th Congress of Deputies (Spain)
University of Minnesota College of Liberal Arts alumni
Politicians from Madrid
Politicians from the Valencian Community
Spanish Socialist Workers' Party politicians
MEPs for Spain 2014–2019
MEPs for Spain 2019–2024
21st-century women MEPs for Spain